The UEFA U-19 Championship 2007 Final Tournament was held in Austria with matches played from 16–27 July 2007. Players born after 1 January 1988 were eligible to participate in this competition.

The draw was made on 13 June 2007. The venues were the Linzer Stadion in Linz, the Waldstadion in Pasching, the Fill Metallbau Stadion in Ried im Innkreis and the Vorwärts-Stadion in Steyr.

Qualification
Qualification for the final tournament was played over two stages:

 2007 UEFA European Under-19 Championship qualification – 1 July 2006 – 21 December 2006
 2007 UEFA European Under-19 Championship elite qualification – 8 May 2007 – 6 June 2007

Squads
For the complete list of players, see 2007 UEFA European Under-19 Championship squads

Finals group stage
In the following tables:

Key:
Pld Matches played, W Won, D Drawn, L Lost, GF Goals for, GA Goals against, GD Goal Difference, Pts Points

Group A

Group B

Knockout stage

Semi-finals

Final

Teams

Winners

Top goalscorers

External links
 Draw and Fixtures at uefa.com

 
2007
UEFA
International association football competitions hosted by Austria
E
July 2007 sports events in Europe
2007 in youth association football